Chinapalakaluru is a village in Guntur district of the Indian state of Andhra Pradesh. It is located in Guntur West mandal (formerly Guntur mandal) of Guntur revenue division.

Geography 

Governance 
Chinapalakaluru gram panchayat is the local self-government of the village. It is divided into wards and each ward is represented by a ward member. The village forms a part of Andhra Pradesh Capital Region and is under the jurisdiction of APCRDA.

Education 

As per the school information report for the academic year 2018–19, the village has only one Mandal Parishad school.

See also 
List of villages in Guntur district

References 

Neighbourhoods in Guntur